Torsås is a locality and the seat of Torsås Municipality, Kalmar County, Sweden with 1,848 inhabitants in 2010.

References 

Municipal seats of Kalmar County
Swedish municipal seats
Populated places in Kalmar County
Populated places in Torsås Municipality